Kazheesirama Vinnagaram or Tadalan Kovil or Tiruvikrama (trivikara) Perumal Temple is a temple dedicated to Vishnu located in Sirkazhi, Tamil Nadu, India. Constructed in the Dravidian style of architecture, the temple is glorified in the Nalayira Divya Prabandham, the early medieval Tamil canon of the Alvar saints from the 6th–9th centuries CE. It is one of the 108 Divya Desam dedicated to Vishnu, who is worshipped as Trivikrama and his consort Lakshmi as Loganayagi. The temple is believed to have been built by Cholas, with later contributions from Medieval Cholas, Vijayanagara kings, and Madurai Nayaks.

The temple is found in Sirkazhi, and situated in a location called Thdalan Koil. The temple complex actually houses all the shrines within a large concentric walls pierced by a three-tiered Rajagopuram. There are three major shrines in the temple with the ones of Trivikrama in the sanctum and two other shrines of Loganyagi and Andal being the most prominent. The temple tank, Chakra Tirtham, is located behind the temple premises.

Vamana, a dwarf and one of the ten avatars of Vishnu, appeared here to quell the pride of asura king Bali. Trivikrama is believed to have appeared to king Mahabali and the Alvars. Four daily rituals and many festivals are held at the temple, of which the Brahmotsavam festival, celebrated during the Tamil month of Vaikasi (May–June), is the most prominent. The temple is maintained and administered by the Hindu Religious and Endowment Board of the Government of Tamil Nadu. The temple follows Tenkalai mode of worship.

Legend

The temple finds mention in Brahmanda Purana as Patalika Vanam and Uttama Kshetram. As per Hindu legend, Brahma boasted about his long life. A sage called Romas wanted to suppress Brahma's thought and he did severe penance at this place. Vishnu was pleased by his devotion, and Vishnu appeared before him. On further request from the sage, Vishnu appeared again as Trivikrama. He gave a boon to the sage that he would get a life longer than that of Brahma and blessed that with each falling hair of the sage, Brahma would lose one year.

The Bhagavata Purana describes that Vishnu descended as the Vamana avatar to restore the authority of Indra over the heavens, as it had been taken by Mahabali, a benevolent asura King. Bali was the grandson of Prahlada. King Mahabali was generous, and engaged in severe austerities and penance and won the praise of the world. With the praise from his courtiers and others, he regarded himself as the all powerful in the world. Vamana, in the guise of a short Brahmin carrying a wooden umbrella, went to the king to request three paces of land. Mahabali consented, against the warning of his guru, Sukracharya. Vamana then revealed his identity and enlarged to gigantic proportions to stride over the three worlds. He stepped from heaven to earth with the first step, from earth to the netherworld with the second. King Mahabali, unable to fulfill his promise, offered his head for the third. Vamana then placed His Foot and gave the king immortality for his humility. In worshiping Mahabali and his ancestor Prahláda, he conceded sovereignty of Pátála, the netherworld. Some texts also report that Vamana did not step into the netherworld, and instead gave its rule to Bali. In giant form, Vamana is known as Trivikrama. The legend is associated with Thrikkakara Temple in Kerala, but also with this temple, Ulagalantha Perumal Temple, Tirukoyilur and Ulagalantha Perumal Temple, Kanchipuram.

Architecture

The temple is located in the holy town of Sirkazhi in Mayiladuthurai district. Thirumangai Alvar was initiated by Saiva Kuravar Sambandar to praise the Almighty through Pasurams.  The God in the temple is praised as Mann alantha Tadalan meaning the one who measured the land.  The name Tadalan is in honour of Tiruvikrama (Vamana) form and the mulavar (prime deity) fixed in the central shrine is in this form. The presiding deity, Tiruvikrama, appeared for sage Ashtakoma.

The temple has a rectangular plan with the sides of the temple covered by tall brick walls. The temple tower, the rajagopuram has a three-tiered structure. The sanctum is approached from the gateway tower through a flagpost, altar, an elevated hall and two other halls namely the Mahamandpa and the Ardhamandapa. The sanctum houses the stone image of Trivikrama in standing posture and also has various other metal images. The shrines of Lokanayagi is located in a shrine around the first sanctum in the north western corner beyond the sanctum and the shrine of Andal is located on the other corner. The temple tank, Chakra Tirtham, is located behind the temple.

Religious importance
This place is believed to be where sage Vishvamitra conducted his Yagna and came to be known as Sidhasrama. The place was in ruins during a time and an old lady is believed to have placed the idol in a pot of rice. When Thirumangai Alvar came to the place, the lady handed over the idol to him and Thirumangai is believed to have constructed the temple. V. V. S. Aiyar quotes that the 610th Tirukkural mentions about the temple. It is also the place where Thirumangai Alvar after coming back from North India defeated Thirugnana Sambandar in debate. The temple is revered in Nalayira Divya Prabandham, the 7th–9th century Vaishnava canon, by Thirumangai Alvar in one hymn of Thirunedunthandagam. The temple is classified as a Divya Desam, one of the 108 Vishnu temples that are mentioned in the book.

Worship and festivals

The temple follows Pancharatra Agama and Thenkalai tradition. The temple priests perform the puja (rituals) during festivals and on a daily basis. Like other Vishnu temples of Tamil Nadu, the priests belong to the Brahmin Vaishnavite sect, which is dedicated to Vishnu. The temple rituals are performed four times a day; Tiruvanandal at 8:00 a.m., Kala santhi at 9:00 a.m., Uchikalam at 12:30 p.m., Ntiyanusandhanam at 6:00 p.m., Irandamkalam at 7:30 p.m. and Ardha Jamam at 9:00 p.m. Each ritual comprises three steps: alangaram (decoration), neivethanam (food offering) and deepa aradanai (waving of lamps) for both Sarangapani and Thayar. The food offering during the six times are curd rice, Ven pongal, spiced rice, dosa, Ven pongal and sugar pongal respectively. The worship is held amidst music with nagaswaram (pipe instrument) and tavil (percussion instrument), religious instructions in the Vedas (sacred text) read by priests and prostration by worshipers in front of the temple mast. There are weekly, fortnightly and monthly rituals. The major festivals celebrated in the temple are 10-day Vaikasi Brahmotsavam, held during the Tamil month of Vaikasi (May - June).

References

External links 

  
 

 
Vishnu temples in Mayiladuthurai district
Vamana temples